Rudolf Pflanz (1 July 1914 – 31 July 1942) was a German Luftwaffe fighter pilot and recipient of the Knight's Cross of the Iron Cross during World War II.  Pflanz claimed 52 aerial victories, all of them over the Western Front.

Early life and career
Pflanz was born in July 1914 in Ichenheim, present-day part of Neuried, at the time in Grand Duchy of Baden of the German Empire. He joined the Luftwaffe and by 1938 was serving with Jagdgeschwader 131 (JG 131—131st Fighter Wing), which on 1 May 1939 was redesignated Jagdgeschwader 2 "Richthofen" (JG 2—2nd Fighter Wing).

World War II
World War II in Europe had begun on Friday 1 September 1939 when German forces invaded Poland. Pflanz claimed his first aerial victory on 30 April 1940 during the early Phoney War period over a Potez 63 northwest of Merzig. At the time, Pflanz was serving with 3. Staffel (3rd squadron) of JG 2 which was commanded by Hauptmann Henning Strümpell. The Staffel was subordinated to I. Gruppe (1st group) of JG 2, based in Bassenheim and headed by Hauptmann Jürgen Roth.

During the Battle of Britain, Pflanz was wingman to Major Helmut Wick in the Stab (headquarters unit) of I. Gruppe of JG 2 and later with the Geschwaderstab of JG 2. On 28 November 1940, Pflanz probably shot down Royal Air Force (RAF) ace Flight Lieutenant John Dundas of No. 609 Squadron just after Dundas had shot down and killed Wick. By the end of 1940 Pflanz had eight victories.

On 23 July 1941 Pflanz claimed five Supermarine Spitfire fighters and a Hawker Hurricane shot down, and consequently claimed "ace-in-a-day" status. JG 2 claimed 29 RAF fighters that day with a further 10 credited to JG 26. Actual RAF losses amounted to 15 aircraft suggesting a high degree of over-claiming.

After recording his 20th victory he was awarded the Knight's Cross of the Iron Cross on 1 August 1941. He received the award from Feldmarschall (Field Marschal) Hugo Sperrle with fellow JG 2 "Richthofen" pilots Leutnant Egon Mayer and Oberleutnant Erich Leie on that day. The triple award presentation was recorded by the Deutsche Wochenschau (German Weekly Review),  a newsreel series released in the cinemas.

On 5 October 1941, Oberleutnant Ulrich Adrian, the Staffelkapitän (squadron leader) of 1. Staffel of JG 2 was killed in action. In consequence, Pflanz was appointed Staffelkapitän of 1. Staffel in November.

Oberleutnant Pflanz was appointed Staffelkapitän of 11. Staffel of JG 2 in May 1942, a special high-altitude unit equipped with the Bf 109G-1 fitted with pressurized cockpits. On 5 June he claimed three Spitfires downed over the Somme. On 31 July 1942, Pflanz was shot down and killed in action in his Messerschmitt Bf 109 G-1 (Werknummer 10318—factory number) south of Moncheaux. He was succeeded by Oberleutnant Julius Meimberg as commander of 11. Staffel. At the time, he was fighting Supermarine Spitfires of No. 121 Squadron over Berck-sur-Mer, France. Prior to being shot down and killed, he had destroyed one Spitfire. Pflanz is buried in the Bourdon German war cemetery, on the Somme.

He was posthumously promoted to the rank of Hauptmann.

Summary of career

Aerial victory claims
Mathews and Foreman, authors of Luftwaffe Aces – Biographies and Victory Claims, researched the German Federal Archives and found records for 52 aerial victory claimsall of which claimed on the Western Front.

Awards
 Honour Goblet of the Luftwaffe (24 July 1941)
 Knight's Cross of the Iron Cross on 1 August 1941 as Oberleutnant and pilot 1./Jagdgeschwader 2
 German Cross in Gold on 16 July 1942 as Oberleutnant in the I./Jagdgeschwader 2

Notes

References

Citations

Bibliography

 
 
 
 
 
 
 
 
 
 
 
 
 
 

1914 births
1942 deaths
People from Ortenaukreis
People from the Grand Duchy of Baden
Luftwaffe pilots
German World War II flying aces
Recipients of the Gold German Cross
Recipients of the Knight's Cross of the Iron Cross
Luftwaffe personnel killed in World War II
Aviators killed by being shot down
Burials at Bourdon German war cemetery
Military personnel from Baden-Württemberg